Lake Montauban is crossed by Noire River, in the municipality of Saint-Alban, in the Portneuf Regional County Municipality, in the administrative region of the Capitale-Nationale, in the Quebec, in Canada.

The area around Lac Montauban is served on the east side by Chemin Antoine-François-Germain and Chemin du Gouverneur-Duquesne. Secondary forest roads serve the other parts. Forestry is the main economic activity in the sector; recreotourism activities, second.

The surface of Lac Montauban is usually frozen from the beginning of December to the end of March, however the safe circulation on the ice is generally made from mid-December to mid-March.

Geography
This lake is located entirely in the forest environment. The north end of the lake is located in the south-eastern part of the municipality of Rivière-à-Pierre, while most of the lake is located in the rank G (crossing 12 lots) and F (through 5 lots), located north of Saint-Alban. Thus, Montauban Lake is located northeast of Saint-Ubalde. The shape of the lake round the east corner of the Municipality of Notre-Dame-de-Montauban. The northern part of the lake extends into a strait leading to three small lakes including lake Nicolas and "petit lac Nicolas" (small lake Nicolas).

With , the Portneuf Regional Natural Park includes Long lake, Montauban, Carillon, Sept-Îles, En Cœur (In Heart), "À l'Anguille" (at the Eel) and some other water bodies more secondary. This park is popular for tourist activities: hiking trails, boat ramp to the water... This dam was built in wood in 1960 was rebuilt in concrete in 2011.

Lake Carillon is located west of the southern end of Lake Montauban, while Nadeau Lake is located in the south near the "long lake". Montauban lake discharges into the "Long Lake" located in the southeast. It discharges from the south in the Black River (Portneuf), which crosses the Saint Lawrence Lowlands serpentine manner to the village of Saint-Casimir where it flows into the Sainte-Anne River.

Toponymy
The toponym "Lac Montauban" was recorded as of December 5, 1968, at the Bank of place names in Commission de toponymie du Québec (Geographical Names Board of Québec).

References

See also
 Portneuf Regional County Municipality (MRC)
 Saint-Alban
 Portneuf Regional Natural Park
 Noire River

Lakes of Capitale-Nationale
Lakes of Mauricie
Mékinac Regional County Municipality